This is a list of words and phrases related to death in alphabetical order. While some of them are slang, others euphemize the unpleasantness of the subject, or are used in formal contexts. Some of the phrases may carry the meaning of 'kill', or simply contain words related to death. Most of them are idioms.

See also

 Dead Parrot sketch; contains many euphemisms for dying
 Wikisaurus:die
 Wikisaurus:death
 List of death deities

References

English phrases
Lists of English phrases
Expressions related to death